North queen or variation, may refer to:

Ships
 , a freighter launched in 1944 and wrecked in 1961, also called Melville Jacoby, Dominator
 , a ship built in 1908; see List of ships built by Hall, Russell & Company (401-500)

Other uses
 North Queen (Myanmar), a Burmese title; see List of Burmese royal consorts
 North Queen (horse), a racehorse  and winner of the 2005 Baden Racing Stuten-Preis

See also

 North (disambiguation)
 Queen (disambiguation)
 Northern queen (disambiguation)
 Queen of the North (disambiguation)